Zeke is a masculine given name or nickname.

Zeke may also refer to:

Zeke, Allied code name for the Mitsubishi A6M Zero Japanese World War II fighter
Tropical Storm Zeke, two typhoons and a tropical storm, all in the early 1990s
Zeke (band), American hardcore punk band
Zeke, Burkina Faso, a village
Zero electron kinetic energy spectroscopy, a form of high resolution photoelectron spectroscopy
 Zeke, the artificial intelligence agent in development by Hub Culture

See also
Big Zeke, a ring name for professional wrestler Ezekiel Jackson